Radford University College is a private university in East Legon, Accra, Ghana. It is affiliated with Kwame Nkrumah University of Science and Technology, and was most recently accredited in 2019 by the Ghana Tertiary Education Commission.

Faculties
Faculty of Allied Health
Faculty of Business Science
Faculty of Fine Arts
Faculty of Applied Sciences

Departments & programmes

Department of Business Administration
B.Sc. Business Administration 
 Human Resource Management
 Marketing
 Entrepreneurship Development
 Accounting
 Banking & Finance

Department of Information Communication Technology
BSc Information Communication Technology
 Database Management
 Computer Networking
 System Analysis
 Web Development
 Computer Security

Department of Applied Science (Geology & Environmental Science)
 Applied Geophysics
 Environmental Geosciences
 Gemmology and Related Industries
 Geo-park Development and Management
 Geology and Earth Science Education
 Mining and Project Management
 Medical Geology
 Petroleum, Hydrogeology and Related Industries

References

Kwame Nkrumah University of Science and Technology
Universities in Ghana